The Fargo-Moorhead RedHawks are a professional minor-league baseball team based in Fargo, North Dakota, in the United States. The RedHawks are members of the American Association of Professional Baseball, an official Partner League of Major League Baseball. The RedHawks have played their home games at Newman Outdoor Field since 1996, when the team started as members of the Northern League.

History
The team was created as a Northern League expansion franchise in 1996 along with the now-defunct Madison Black Wolf. Chris Coste is probably the most well-known former RedHawks player and was a member of the 2008 World Series-winning Philadelphia Phillies. The RedHawks, along with the St. Paul Saints, have been one of the most stable and successful independent baseball teams over the past 15 years.

They are reported to have had the first broadcast by minor league professional baseball on the internet.

In fifteen seasons in the Northern League, the RedHawks set the modern Northern League best single-season record for winning percentage with a 64–21 (.753) mark in 1998, set the record for most wins in a season with 68 in 2005, made it to the playoffs in 14 of 15 seasons, won five Northern League titles, and were named Baseball America's Independent Team of the Decade for the 1990s.

The 1998 team recorded a combined record of 70 wins and 22 losses during the regular season and playoffs (.761).

On October 13, 2010, the RedHawks left the Northern League, along with the Gary SouthShore RailCats, Kansas City T-Bones, and the Winnipeg Goldeyes to join the American Association for the 2011 season. The four remaining Northern League teams all folded or left the league. Accordingly, the Northern League ceased operations and folded in October 2010. As a result, the RedHawks have the distinction of being the last league champion. They have won the 2012 and 2013 American Association North Division championship.

On August 13, 2017, the Redhawks relieved Doug Simunic of his duties as field manager. Simunic had served in the position for all 22 years of the team's existence. He was replaced by pitching coach Michael Schlact, who after finishing the season on an interim basis was named the permanent manager on September 7, 2017. Michael Schlact managed one season with the RedHawks, before stepping down in February 2019 to take a coaching position within the Milwaukee Brewers minor league system. On March 20, 2019, Jim Bennett was named as the franchise's third manager. The team went on to a 63–37 record and lost in the North Division championship series to St. Paul 3–2 in the best-of-five series. Bennett was named the American Association's Manager of the Year.

In 2020, the RedHawks were one of six teams selected to compete in the condensed 60-game season due to the COVID-19 pandemic. Newman Outdoor Field served as one of the hubs where games were played; the team shared their home field with the Winnipeg Goldeyes. Prior to the start of the season on July 3, the team announced that Jim Bennett would not return as manager and named hitting coach Chris Coste interim manager.

Fast facts
Franchise record (through 2022): 1546–1095 (.586)
Northern League record (1996–2010): 898–553 (.618)
American Association record (2011–2022): 648-542 (.545)
Northern League playoff appearances: 1996, 1997, 1998, 1999, 2000, 2001, 2003, 2004, 2005, 2006, 2007, 2008, 2009, 2010
American Association playoff appearances: 2012, 2013, 2019, 2021, 2022
Northern League division titles: 1996, 1997, 1998, 2000, 2003, 2004, 2005, 2006, 2007, 2008, 2010
American Association division titles: 2012, 2013, 2021, 2022
Northern League championships: 1998, 2003, 2006, 2009, 2010
American Association championships: 2022

Season-by-season records

Roster

Retired numbers 
 42 Jackie Robinson
 8 Roger Maris
 35 Jeff Bittiger
 7 Joe Mathis
 19 Jake Laber

Notable alumni

 Billy Ashley (2000)
 Rich Becker (2002)
 Harry Berrios (2006)
 Jeff Bittiger (1996-2002)
 Brent Bowers (2001)
 Mike Busch (1999)
 Ozzie Canseco (1998)
 Cris Colón (2000-2001)
 Chris Coste (1996-1999)
 Enrique Cruz (2012)
 Yurendell DeCaster (2009)
 Mike Figga (2002)
 Tim Flakoll (founding employee)
 Tyler Graham (2013)
 Bradin Hagens (2019-2020)
 Tyler Herron (2012, 2015-2017, 2021)
 Jimmy Hurst (2008)
 Blaise Ilsley (1998)
 Brandon Mann (2015)
 Donzell McDonald (2009)
 Juan Melo (2003, 2007)
 Darryl Motley (1996-1999)
 Jordan Patterson (2020)
 Jason Pearson (2000)
 Zach Penprase (2008-2011, 2012-2015)
 Dante Powell (2002)
 Dan Rohrmeier (2002)
 Randall Simon (2009)
 Brian Traxler (1996-1997)
 Jon Weber (2002-2003, 2007)
 Eddie Williams (2002)
 Maury Wills (coach, 1996-1997)

References

External links
Fargo-Moorhead RedHawks website
American Association of Professional Baseball website
nlfan.com Fargo-Moorhead RedHawks' Guide

 
American Association of Professional Baseball teams
Sports in Fargo, North Dakota
Northern League (baseball, 1993–2010) teams
Professional baseball teams in North Dakota